Man in the Street may refer to:

Music
"Man in the Street", a 1964 song written and performed by The Skatalites
"Man in the Street", song performed by The Hooters in the 1980s
"Man in the Street", song on the 1998 album Hell of a Tester by The Rasmus
"Man in the Street", song on the 1979 Rockers (soundtrack) album

Other uses
 A Man on the street interview
"Man in the Street", an episode of All in the Family 1970s TV series
L'Homme dans la rue, a 1939 Maigret short story by Georges Simenon

See also
T.C. Mits, acronym for "the celebrated man in the street"
Everyman
Vox populi (disambiguation)
"I'll Tell the Man in the Street", song in 1938 stage musical I Married An Angel